Loving, Never Forgetting is a 2014 Chinese television series starring Jerry Yan and Tong Liya. It is based on the novel Wu Ai Cheng Huan (无爱承欢) by Lan Bai Se. The series was broadcast by ZJSTV from 23 June to 5 July 2014 for 34 episodes.

Synopsis 
Li Zhongmou (Jerry Yan) is a rich businessman who had a one-night stand with Wu Tong (Tong Liya) a few years ago. He forgot about her until later, in an accident in which a young boy was injured; and after verification, it was confirmed that the little boy, Wu Tong Tong is indeed his son.
 
In order to gain back his son, Li Zhongmou takes Wu Tong to court and tries to win the custody of the boy. However, later, due to his lack of maternal love as a child, he does not want his son to grow up the same way, so he agrees to share custody with her. As time goes on, touched by Wu Tong's intimate relationship with their son and her kindness, Li Zhongmou finds himself falling for Wu Tong. However, Li Zhongmou's rival and half-brother, Xiang Jun (Denny Huang) also begins to fall in love with her.

Eventually, Li Zhongmou and Wu Tong marry, but they are unable to tell others because of opposition by their families. After experiencing life and death, resentment and prejudice, everyone eventually learns to understand, trust and love. Li Zhongmou and Wu Tong overcome misunderstandings that threaten to ruin their relationship and from separation find their way back to each other.

Cast 
 Jerry Yan as Li Zhongmou 
 Tong Liya as Wu Tong 
 Denny Huang as Xiang Jun
 Wang Yintong as Wu/Li Tongtong 
 Feng Jing as Zhang Mandi 
 You You as Liang Yueqi
 Wu Yufang as Li Zhining
 Lu Xing as Lin Jiandong
 Liu Xin as Mei Ling
 He Tongsheng as Xiang Yi
 Wang Jianxin as Liang Ruiqiang

Soundtrack

Ratings 

 Highest ratings are marked in red, lowest ratings are marked in blue

References

External links 
  

Chinese romance television series
2014 Chinese television series debuts
2014 Chinese television series endings
Television shows based on Chinese novels
Zhejiang Television original programming